Sir Mokshagundam Visvesvaraya Institute of Technology (commonly referred to as Sir MVIT) is an Indian educational institution located in Bengaluru, Karnataka.  The institute is affiliated to Visvesvaraya Technological University and approved by All India Council for Technical Education, New Delhi. Sir MVIT is an ISO 9001:2008 certified institution. It offers programs in the field of technical education.

History
The institute was founded and established in 1986 by the ′Sri Krishnadevaraya Educational Trust′. It was named after Indian scientist Mokshagundam Visvesvaraya.

Location
Although it is far from the city centre, it is accessible as BMTC buses ply within walking distance, and some pass through the college campus itself, like 283A.

Campus
Apart from the Engineering College, there's a M.B.A department, Sir M V School of Architecture (B.E) and a Dental College (Krishnadevaraya College of Dental Sciences and Hospital) as well, where all students and working staff can get the treatment done with concessions of 50%. The institute power requirements are met by a dedicated HT power connection from BESCOM and captive power generating units. The institute is connected to all the parts of the city by its own fleet of buses. All the students admitted to the institute are covered by insurance for life and medical care.

Academics

Undergraduate courses
 B.E. (four-year program that leads to a Bachelor of Engineering degree)
 Electronics and communication engineering
 Computer science and engineering
 Mechanical engineering
 Civil engineering
 Electrical and electronics engineering
 Telecommunication engineering
 Industrial engineering and management
 Information science and engineering
 Biotechnology

Graduate courses
 M.Tech. (two-year program that leads to a Master of Technology Degree)
 Electronics & communication engineering
 Mechanical engineering (computer integrated manufacturing)
 Bio-Technology

 M.B.A.
 M.C.A.
 M.Sc. (Engg)
 Ph.D

Inter-college festivals
"Kalanjali" is an annual inter-collegiate cultural festival of the college that sees participation from students at institutes all across the state. It is usually two- to three-day festival that showcases the college's talent and competitive spirit with students competing statewide. The events normally include:
 Invocation
 Annual college performance report
 Performance of the departments
 Review of academic and cultural progress along with sports
 Competitions ranging from fine arts such as singing, theatre, to technical paper presentations, programming contests
 Contests, shows
 Motivational tid-bits from distinguished speakers
 Prize distributions

College also hosts ′Aisiri′ (meaning: richness) an annual cultural event, in the month of March, starting from 2011. the main objective of event is to promote & showcase the rich culture & heritage of Karnataka to all its students, especially non Kannadigas. The event includes performance by various famous artists of Karnataka like Pranesh, Narasimha Joshi, Mysuru Anand, Prof. Krishne Gowda, Indushree, Magician Kudroli Ganesh etc.
 
"Verve" is an intra-college festival of the same joyous spirit as "Kalanjali" but on a smaller scale. "Kalanjali" counts as the biggest celebrations event at Sir M. Visveswaraya Institute of Technology (Sir M.V.I.T). It is held in October. Apart from that, various other festivals like Technofest, E-fest, Susanskruti & Department level Fests like Zuesville, Aadhar and Petrichor are organized at the college.

Rankings

 Sir M. Visvesvaraya Institute of Technology has been ranked #49 all over India by "Careers 360" (Year 2011).
 Sir M. Visvesvaraya Institute of Technology has been ranked #51 all over India by "The Week" (Year 2012).
 Sir M. Visvesvaraya Institute of Technology has been ranked #34 all over India by "Dataquest" (Year 2011).
 Sir M. Visvesvaraya Institute of Technology has been ranked #63 all over India by "Outlook" (Year 2011).
 Sir M. Visvesvaraya Institute of Technology has been ranked #71 all over India by "Outlook" (Year 2012).
 Sir M. Visvesvaraya Institute of Technology has been ranked #2nd in Karnataka, 17th in India in "IDC Survey" Published in June 2008.
 Sir M. Visvesvaraya Institute of Technology has been ranked #2nd among the engineering colleges in the Karnataka State by the magazine "Dataquest".

References

External links
 Official Web Site Sir M. Visvesvaraya Institute of Technology.

Engineering colleges in Bangalore